Gambling Ship is a 1938 American mystery film directed by Aubrey Scotto and written by Alex Gottlieb. The film stars Robert Wilcox, Helen Mack, Edward Brophy, Irving Pichel, Joe Sawyer and Selmer Jackson. The film was released on December 16, 1938, by Universal Pictures.

Plot
Gambler helps a debt-ridden orphanage that was started by his late wife.

Cast

Production
Production began on the film in early November 1938.
The film was part of the Crime Club mystery series. 11 films were made in the series between 1937 and 1939.

Release
Gambling Ship was distributed by Universal Pictures Company, Inc. on December 16, 1938.

Reception
From contemporary reviews, a reviewer in Variety described the film as a "dawdling cheapie with a light cast which topples to the status of a 'C' programmer."

References

Footnotes

Sources

External links
 

1938 films
American mystery films
1938 mystery films
Universal Pictures films
Films directed by Aubrey Scotto
American black-and-white films
1930s English-language films
1930s American films